Willy Andersen, alternatively spelled Willy Andresen (29 January 1925 – 11 February 2013) was a Norwegian footballer.

Club career
He played for Sarpsborg FK the most of his career. He also had a short career spell abroad, in Stade Français Paris.

International career
He was capped six times for Norway from 1949 to 1950, scoring four goals. He made his debut on 18 May 1949 in a Friendly against England and scored Norway's only goal in a 4-1 defeat.

International goals
''Norway score listed first, score column indicates score after each Andersen goal.

References

1925 births
2013 deaths
People from Sarpsborg
Norwegian footballers
Sarpsborg FK players
Stade Français (association football) players
Norway international footballers
Norwegian expatriate footballers
Expatriate footballers in France
Norwegian expatriate sportspeople in France
Association football forwards
Sportspeople from Viken (county)